Acobamba District may refer to the following districts of Peru:

 Acobamba District, Acobamba
 Acobamba District, Sihuas
 Acobamba District, Tarma

District name disambiguation pages